Masakazu is a masculine Japanese given name. Notable people with the name include:

Imafuku Masakazu (died 1582), Japanese samurai of the Sengoku period who served the Takeda clan
Kobori Masakazu (1579–1647), artist and aristocrat in the reign of Tokugawa Ieyasu
Masakazu Fujiwara (born 1981), Japanese long-distance runner who specializes in the marathon
Masakazu Fukuda (1972–2000), Japanese professional wrestler
Masakazu Imanari (born 1976), Japanese mixed martial arts fighter best known for his leglocks
, Japanese cyclist
Masakazu Kagiyama (born 1971), Japanese figure skater who is now a coach
Masakazu Katsura (born 1962), Japanese manga artist
Masakazu Kawabe (1886–1965), general in the Imperial Japanese Army
Masakazu Koda (born 1969), former Japanese football player
Masakazu Kondō, Japanese shogi player
Masakazu Konishi (1933–2020), Japanese biologist
Masakazu Morita (born 1972), Japanese voice actor and actor
Masakazu Nakai (1900–1952), Japanese aesthetician, film theorist, librarian, and social activist
, Japanese anime director
Masakazu Sekiguchi (born 1953), Japanese politician of the Liberal Democratic Party
Shinagawa Masakazu (1544–1565), Japanese samurai of the Sengoku period who served the Mōri clan
Masakazu Suzuki, retired Japanese football player and manager
Masakazu Tamura (born 1943), Japanese film and theatre actor
Masakazu Tashiro (born 1988), Japanese football player
Masakazu Yoshizawa (1950–2007), Japanese American flautist and musician, known for his mastery of the shakuhachi
 Masakazu Watanabe, Japanese shogi player
, Japanese manga artist
, Japanese writer, literary critic and philosopher

Japanese masculine given names

de:Masakazu